The discography of Pete Seeger, an American folk singer, consists of 52 studio albums, 23 compilation albums, 22 live albums, and 31 singles. Seeger's musical career started in 1940 when he joined The Almanac Singers. He stayed with the group for two years until he was drafted into the Army to fight in the Second World War. After the end of World War II in 1945, Seeger helped found an organization known as People's Songs, along with the influential folk music magazine People's Songs Bulletin. He published several singles and a studio album with the magazine. Seeger would play at People's Songs events, called hootenannies, until the organization folded in 1949. After People's Songs, Seeger and another former member of the Almanacs, Lee Hays, founded the Weavers, who achieved commercial success. In 1952, The Weavers went on hiatus due to the Red Scare; Seeger and Hays both had Communist ties. After the demise of the Weavers, Seeger released a solo album, American Folk Songs for Children, in 1953 on Folkways Records. He continued to release albums on Folkways until he signed with Capitol in 1961.

Albums

Studio albums

Live albums

Compilation albums

Singles

"—" denotes a recording that did not chart or was not released in that territory.

References

Notes

Citations

Bibliography

Links
 

Discography
Discographies of American artists